Falcon Dam is an earthen embankment dam on the Rio Grande between Starr County in the U.S. state of Texas and the city of Nueva Ciudad Guerrero in the Mexican state of Tamaulipas. The dam was built for water conservation, irrigation, hydroelectric power generation, flood control, and recreational purposes and as an international border crossing between Zapata and Starr Counties and Tamaulipas. Construction on the dam began in December 1950 and ended in April 1954 but it was dedicated by presidents Adolfo Ruiz Cortines and Dwight D. Eisenhower in October 1953.

Construction
The Falcon Dam was authorized by the Treaty for the Utilization of Waters of the Colorado and Tijuana Rivers and of the Rio Grande or Water Treaty of 1944 between Mexico and the United States. Construction on the dam began on 15 December 1950 and the reservoir began to fill on 25 August 1953. The dam was dedicated on 19 October 1953 and work was officially complete on 8 April 1954. By October 1954, the dam's hydroelectric power station began to produce electricity.

Characteristics

The Falcon Dam supplies water to two different hydroelectric power plants, one on the Mexican side and another on the U.S. side. Each power plant contains 3 x 10.5 MW Francis turbine generators for a combined total of 63 MW. Each power plant also receives water from the reservoir via 4 x  diameter penstocks. The two extra penstocks are for an additional generator if needed.

Border crossing

The Falcon Dam Port of Entry is a port of entry at the Falcon Dam to the United States on the Mexican border. It is essentially a replacement for the former Zapata Port of Entry, which was situated at a bridge in the town of Zapata, Texas.  When the dam was completed, the town was moved to higher ground, and the Zapata Bridge now lies at the bottom of Falcon Lake.

2010 Plot
In June 2010, U.S. authorities revealed that the Los Zetas drug cartel had planned to destroy the Falcon Dam to terrorize the rival Gulf Cartel, which smuggles drugs in the area. Small amounts of dynamite discovered near the dam and a copy of a warning helped alert authorities. A larger U.S. and Mexican security presence in the area may have thwarted the attack that Los Zetas had reportedly warned civilians about on the Mexican side of the border.

References

External links

 Falcon Dam & Power Plant - U.S. State Dept Website
 

Dams in Texas
Buildings and structures in Starr County, Texas
Hydroelectric power plants in Texas
Hydroelectric power stations in Mexico
Dams in Mexico
Dams completed in 1954
Energy infrastructure completed in 1954
Dams on the Rio Grande
1954 establishments in Texas
1954 establishments in Mexico